Got No Shadow is an album by Mary Lou Lord, released in early 1998 on Work Records.

Song information 
"His Lamest Flame" is a reference to the Elvis Presley song "(Marie's the Name) His Latest Flame".

The song "She Had You" was a hit in the Philippines, it was played in an FM radio NU 107 midnight count down.

The song "Lights Are Changing" is a cover song, the original done by British band The Bevis Frond, appearing on their 1988 album, Triptych.

The song "Some Jingle Jangle Morning" is a re-recording of the same song which appeared on Mary Lou Lord's debut 7" ep for Kill Rock Stars in 1993. The song is said to be about Kurt Cobain., as Mary Lou was briefly involved with Kurt in the early 1990s at the beginning of Nirvana's rise to fame.

The song "Shake Sugaree" is a cover of an old folk and blues song written by Elizabeth Cotten.

Reception

Track listing
"His Lamest Flame" (Nick Saloman, Mary Lou Lord) – 3:37
"Western Union Desperate" (Lord) – 3:09
"Lights Are Changing" (Saloman) – 5:23
"Seven Sisters" (Lord) – 3:36
"Throng of Blowtown" (Lord) – 3:25
"The Lucky One" (Freedy Johnston) – 3:07
"She Had You" (Saloman) – 3:57
"Some Jingle Jangle Morning (When I'm Straight)" (Lord) – 3:44
"Shake Sugaree" (Elizabeth Cotten) – 2:21
"Two Boats" (Saloman, Lord) – 4:02
"Supergun" (Saloman) – 3:34
"Down Along the Lea" (Saloman) – 2:04
"Subway" (Lord, Saloman) – 4:14

Personnel
Mary Lou Lord - Vocals
Shawn Colvin - Background vocals
Nick Saloman - Acoustic guitar, guitar
John Sprague - Bass guitar
Cait Reed - Violin, tin whistle
Will Goldsmith - Drums
Gia Ciambotti - Background vocals
Joe Ramieri - Drums, percussion
Beale Dabbs - Steel guitar
Rusty Anderson - 12-String guitar
Stephen Silbert - 12-String guitar, acoustic guitar
Roger McGuinn - Electric 12-String guitar
Paul Bushnell - Bass guitar
Nels Cline - Baritone guitar, E-Bow guitar, guitar
Jon Brion - Chamberlin, harmonium
Ethan Johns - Steel guitar, slide guitar, accordion
Rob Schnapf - Acoustic guitar
Money Mark - Organ
Elliott Smith - Acoustic guitar
Ruth Barrett - Dulcimer
Joshua Freese - Drums

References 

1998 debut albums
Mary Lou Lord albums
Work Records albums
Albums produced by Rob Schnapf
Albums produced by Tom Rothrock